Lynette "Lyn" Jacenko (née Tillett) (born 15 August 1953) is a retired Australian long jumper.

A star junior champion in high jump, long jump, sprints and hurdles, she was selected to represent Australia in the 1972 Summer Olympics in long jump and pentathlon at age 18.  Just prior to the Games in Munich, she jumped an Australian and Under 20 long jump record of 6.60 metres, but could not qualify for the finals of the Olympic event.

In 1977, she won the inaugural World Cup event and was ranked in the top ten in the world.

She represented Australia at the 1974 Auckland and 1978 Edmonton Commonwealth Games.

See also
 Australian athletics champions (Women)

References

1953 births
Living people
Australian female sprinters
Australian female long jumpers
Athletes (track and field) at the 1972 Summer Olympics
Olympic athletes of Australia
Athletes (track and field) at the 1974 British Commonwealth Games
Athletes (track and field) at the 1978 Commonwealth Games
Commonwealth Games medallists in athletics
Commonwealth Games bronze medallists for Australia
21st-century Australian women
20th-century Australian women
Medallists at the 1978 Commonwealth Games